Ischnocnema bolbodactyla is a species of frog in the family Brachycephalidae. It is endemic to the southern Rio de Janeiro state in Brazil; records from São Paulo apply to Ischnocnema nigriventris and Ischnocnema gehrti.

Ischnocnema bolbodactyla is a leaf-litter species inhabiting primary and secondary forest and forest edge. Reproduction is probably through direct development. It is threatened by habitat loss caused by deforestation, infrastructure development, and fires.

References

bolbodactyla
Endemic fauna of Brazil
Amphibians of Brazil
Amphibians described in 1925
Taxa named by Adolfo Lutz
Taxonomy articles created by Polbot